Colorado's 33rd Senate district is one of 35 districts in the Colorado Senate. It has been represented by Democrat James Coleman since 2021, succeeding fellow Democrat Angela Williams.

Geography
District 33 covers northern and northeastern Denver, including the Denver International Airport, the largest airport (by land area) in the country and the largest employer in the state.

The district is located entirely within Colorado's 1st congressional district, and overlaps with the 5th, 6th, 7th, and 8th districts of the Colorado House of Representatives.

Recent election results
Colorado state senators are elected to staggered four-year terms; under normal circumstances, the 33rd district holds elections in presidential years.

2020

2016

2012

Federal and statewide results in District 33

References 

33
Government of Denver